DKR Engineering is a racing team and preparation firm from Luxembourg, which competed in the FIA GT1 World Championship.  The company was founded in 2004 by Kendy Janclaes as a branch of the PSI Experience racing team from Belgium.  After running PSI's racing programs, DKR began their own programs in 2008, running in the FFSA GT Championship with Corvettes.  DKR expanded into the FIA GT Championship in 2009 where PSI had previously competed, running their own program under the Sangari Team Brazil banner and netting a single victory and sixth in the Teams' Championship.  DKR's FFSA GT squad won five races in 2009 and secured the Drivers' Championship for Eric Debard.

In 2010 DKR Engineering partnered with fellow Corvette campaigner Selleslagh Racing Team to compete as a two-car team under Mad-Croc Racing banner in the FIA GT1 World Championship.  After a single victory over the season, Selleslagh and DKR will split, forming their own teams for the 2011 season.

The team are four-time LMP3 champions of the Michelin Le Mans Cup and currently lead the standings in 2020.

They have entered Le Mans twice: originally in 2013 with a Lola B11/40-Judd, promoted from the reserve entry list when Gulf Racing withdrew, and in 2022, qualifying for an automatic place through their championship LMP3 win in European Le Mans Series and opting to run in the LMP2 Pro-Am subclass, with the ELMS duo of Jean Glorieux and  Laurents Hörr stepping up. The mandatory third driver has not been confirmed.

References

External links

 

Luxembourgian auto racing teams
Auto racing teams established in 2004
2004 establishments in Luxembourg
FIA GT1 World Championship teams
FIA GT Championship teams
Blancpain Endurance Series teams
European Le Mans Series teams

24 Hours of Le Mans teams
Formula Renault teams